Meir is a station in the Antwerp premetro which opened on 23 March 1975. The station is located directly underneath the street Meir, after which it is named.

With Groenplaats and Opera, Meir forms the oldest part of the city's premetro network. It is served by tramlines 3, 5, 9 and 15. Tram line 7 passes in close proximity at street level.

Location
The station is located in central Antwerp at the western end of the Meir street. In its immediate vicinity is the Boerentoren, a 1930s art deco building which at the time of its construction was Europe's first skyscraper.

References

Antwerp Premetro
Railway stations opened in 1975
1975 establishments in Belgium